Beryl Alice Evans  (née Williams; 25 February 1922 – 16 May 2006) was an Australian politician.

Early career
Born to David Reginald Williams and Mabel Lawson in Sydney, she was educated at Methodist Ladies' College in Burwood before joining the Royal Australian Air Force (Women's Auxiliary Australian Air Force) on 12 November 1942. She was a drill and physical training instructor, rising to the rank of Sergeant before her commission in 1944. When she was discharged on 25 September 1945 she had attained the rank of section officer.

She was subsequently a farmer and grazier; she had married Kenneth Graham Bowman in 1944, with whom she had two sons, Christopher and Gawain. In 1962 she was elected to Coolah Shire Council, where she remained until 1971. She was the unsuccessful Liberal candidate for the state electorate of Burrendong in 1973. Her first marriage ended in divorce in the early 1970s, and on 30 July 1976 she married Richard Evans, a Liberal member of the New South Wales Legislative Council until 1978.

State politics
In 1984, Evans was elected to the Legislative Council as a Liberal. She remained in the council until 1995, when she was removed from the Liberal ticket and contested the election under the designation "The Seniors". She was unsuccessful. She also contested the Senate in 1996 for her new party, but was again unsuccessful, and she retired from politics.

Evans was awarded the Centenary Medal on 1 January 2001 for "service to the veterans' community". She subsequently received the Medal of the Order of Australia (OAM) in the 2006 Australia Day Honours for "service to the community through a range of ex-service, parliamentary and local government organisations".

References

External links
 Evans, Beryl Alice (1922–2006) on the Australian Women's Register website

1922 births
2006 deaths
Liberal Party of Australia members of the Parliament of New South Wales
Politicians from Sydney
Members of the New South Wales Legislative Council
20th-century Australian politicians
Women members of the New South Wales Legislative Council
Recipients of the Medal of the Order of Australia
20th-century Australian women politicians
Royal Australian Air Force personnel of World War II
Royal Australian Air Force officers
Australian women in World War II
Military personnel from New South Wales